

Firn (from Swiss German  "last year's", cognate with before) is partially compacted névé, a type of snow that has been left over from past seasons and has been recrystallized into a substance denser than névé. It is ice that is at an intermediate stage between snow and glacial ice. Firn has the appearance of wet sugar, but has a hardness that makes it extremely resistant to shovelling. Its density generally ranges from 0.35 g/cm3 to 0.9 g/cm3, and it can often be found underneath the snow that accumulates at the head of a glacier.

Snowflakes are compressed under the weight of the overlying snowpack. Individual crystals near the melting point are semiliquid and slick, allowing them to glide along other crystal planes and to fill in the spaces between them, increasing the ice's density. Where the crystals touch they bond together, squeezing the air between them to the surface or into bubbles.

In the summer months, the crystal metamorphosis can occur more rapidly because of water percolation between the crystals. By summer's end, the result is firn.

The minimum altitude that firn accumulates on a glacier is called the firn limit, firn line or snowline.

List of firns
Antarctic Firn
Daniel Bruun Firn
Dreyer Firn
East Northwall Firn
Rink Firn
Sven Hedin Firn
West Northwall Firn

Other uses 
In colloquial and technical language, "firn" is used to describe certain forms of old snow, including:
 old snowfields, known as Firnfelder, even if the snow is not yet one year old
 the more recent snow layers of a temperate, or "firned", glacier
 used in skiing, the uppermost, soft layer of snow that is frozen overnight and, as a result of spring sunshine and high air temperatures, melts and reforms on an area of old snow or harsch (referring to the snow's rough texture)
As in the last context, a ski slope that experiences melting and refreezing into harsch is said to "firn up". In Switzerland, these slopes are called Sulz, but in Germany, Sulz more often refers to a depth at which skiing downhill is no longer enjoyable.

References

Sources
 
 

 

Glaciology
Water ice
Montane ecology
Mountaineering
Snow